Perth Canyon is a submarine canyon located on the edge of the continental shelf off the coast of Perth, Western Australia, approximately  west of Rottnest Island. It was carved by the Swan River, probably before the Tertiary, when this part of the continental shelf was above sea level.

The canyon is considered "a perfect spot" for deep sea fishing.

The Perth Canyon is a feeding ground for pygmy blue whales, especially at the rims of the abyss. It is also a training ground for the Royal Australian Navy Submarine Service, stationed at a naval base at nearby Garden Island.

It was visible from space, and scientists claimed at the time that it had the potential to affect the local climate and the climate further abroad. The vortex was described by scientists as a marine "death trap", as it sucked in fish larvae.

See also
 Indian Ocean Gyre

References

Landforms of Western Australia
Submarine canyons of the Indian Ocean